James Brownlow William Gascoyne-Cecil, 2nd Marquess of Salisbury,  (17 April 1791 – 12 April 1868), styled Viscount Cranborne until 1823, was a British Conservative politician. He held office under The Earl of Derby as Lord Privy Seal in 1852 and Lord President of the Council between 1858 and 1859. He was the father of Robert Gascoyne-Cecil, 3rd Marquess of Salisbury, three times Prime Minister of the United Kingdom, and grandfather of Arthur Balfour, who also served as Prime Minister.

Background
Salisbury was the son of James Cecil, 1st Marquess of Salisbury, and Lady Emily Mary Hill, daughter of Wills Hill, 1st Marquess of Downshire.

Political career
Salisbury entered the House of Commons in 1813 as Member of Parliament for Weymouth and Melcombe Regis, a seat he held until 1817, and then sat for Hertford between 1817 and 1823.

In the latter year, he succeeded his father in the marquessate and entered the House of Lords. He served in the Lord Derby's first two cabinets as Lord Privy Seal in 1852 and as Lord President of the Council between 1858 and 1859. He was sworn of the Privy Council in 1826 and made a Knight of the Garter in 1842.

Apart from his political career he also served as titular Lord Lieutenant of Middlesex between 1841 and 1868, and followed his father as Colonel of the Hertfordshire Militia. During a period of unrest in 1830 he raised the South Hertfordshire Yeomanry Cavalry and commanded it with the rank of Major. He was promoted to Lieutenant-Colonel the following year when the regiment was expanded. In 1847, however, he exchanged with his second-in-command, James Grimston, 2nd Earl of Verulam, and reverted to the rank of major.

Family
Lord Salisbury was married twice. His first marriage was on 2 February 1821 to Frances Mary Gascoyne (born 25 January 1802, died 15 October 1839), daughter of Bamber Gascoyne of Childwall Hall, Lancashire, and his wife Sarah Bridget Frances Price. A biography of her by Carola Oman appeared in 1966. The couple had six children, including:
James Emilius William Evelyn Gascoyne-Cecil, Viscount Cranborne (29 October 1821 – 14 June 1865), died unmarried.
Lady Mildred Arabella Charlotte Gascoyne-Cecil (21 October 1822 – 18 March 1881), married Alexander Beresford Hope and had children.
Lord Arthur Gascoyne-Cecil (19 December 1823 – 25 April 1825), died in infancy.
Lady Blanche Mary Harriet (5 March 1825 – 16 May 1872), married James Maitland Balfour; mother of Prime Minister Arthur Balfour.
Robert Arthur Talbot Gascoyne-Cecil, 3rd Marquess of Salisbury (3 February 1830 – 22 August 1903), Prime Minister of the United Kingdom three times between 1885 and 1902, married Georgina Alderson and had children.
Lieutenant-Colonel Lord Eustace Brownlow Henry Gascoyne-Cecil (24 April 1834 – 3 July 1921), married Lady Gertrude Louisa Scott and had children.

Lord Salisbury's second marriage, on 29 April 1847, was to Lady Mary Catherine Sackville-West, daughter of George Sackville-West, 5th Earl De La Warr, and Elizabeth Sackville-West, Countess De La Warr, with whom he had five children: 
Lord Sackville Arthur Cecil (16 March 1848 – 29 January 1898), died unmarried.
Lady Mary Arabella Arthur Cecil (26 April 1850 – 18 August 1903), married Alan Stewart, 10th Earl of Galloway.
Lady Margaret Elizabeth Cecil (1850 – 11 March 1919), died unmarried.
Lord Arthur Cecil (3 July 1851– 16 July 1913), married Elizabeth Ann Wilson and had children; married secondly, in 1902, Frederica von Klenck, daughter of diplomat Baron Otto von Klenck, of Gmunden, and his British-born wife née Stewart.
Lieutenant-Colonel Lord Lionel Cecil (21 March 1853 – 13 January 1901), died unmarried.

Lord Salisbury died in April 1868, aged 76, and was succeeded as marquess by his third, eldest surviving son, Robert. The Marchioness of Salisbury died in December 1900.

External links

References

1791 births
1868 deaths
James
Cranborne, James Gascoyne-Cecil, Viscount
Knights of the Garter
Lord-Lieutenants of Middlesex
Salisbury2
Hertfordshire Yeomanry officers
Lord Presidents of the Council
Lords Privy Seal
Cranborne, James Gascoyne-Cecil, Viscount
Cranborne, James Gascoyne-Cecil, Viscount
Cranborne, James Gascoyne-Cecil, Viscount
Cranborne, James Gascoyne-Cecil, Viscount
Salisbury, M2
James, Salisbury 2
Members of the Privy Council of the United Kingdom
Parents of prime ministers of the United Kingdom